Johannes Hendrikus "Snaar" Viljoen (11 January 1904 – 3 September 1976) was a South African athlete. He competed at the 1928 Summer Olympics in the long jump, triple jump, 100 meters, 110 meter hurdles and decathlon, but failed to reach the finals.

At the 1930 Empire Games he won the gold medal in the high jump and the bronze medal in the long jump, finishing fourth in the 120 yards hurdles. He also participated in the 220 yards, in the 440 yards hurdles, and in the hammer throw contests. Four years later at the 1934 British Empire Games he reached the 120 yards hurdles final, but did not finish the race.

Competition record

References

1904 births
1976 deaths
People from Emthanjeni Local Municipality
Afrikaner people
South African male sprinters
South African male hurdlers
South African male high jumpers
South African male long jumpers
South African male triple jumpers
South African decathletes
South African male hammer throwers
Olympic athletes of South Africa
Athletes (track and field) at the 1928 Summer Olympics
Athletes (track and field) at the 1930 British Empire Games
Athletes (track and field) at the 1934 British Empire Games
Commonwealth Games gold medallists for South Africa
Commonwealth Games bronze medallists for South Africa
Commonwealth Games medallists in athletics
Sportspeople from the Northern Cape
20th-century South African people
Medallists at the 1930 British Empire Games